Piet Sielck (born 14 November 1964) is a German power metal guitarist, vocalist and producer. He is member of the power/speed metal band Iron Savior as well as owner of the studio Powerhouse in Hamburg.

Early years

Born in Hamburg, Germany, Piet started playing piano at the age of eight and bass at the age of ten, but realized after half a year that bass was not his favourite instrument and took up the guitar.

Career and development
Sielck's first band was Gentry, which he formed along with Kai Hansen. In 1982, he left the band and worked first as a technician, then traveled for one year to Los Angeles. After his return, he began his career as a producer; his first production was Heading for Tomorrow, the debut album of Gamma Ray, the new band of his old friend Hansen. Other bands with which he cooperated are Uriah Heep, Saxon, and Blind Guardian. He maintains a good relationship with many bands, having participated in several of their albums as a guest musician.

In 1996, Sielck created his own band, Iron Savior, together with Hansen and Blind Guardian's then-drummer Thomen Stauch. Those two would step out later, but Sielck continued the band with new musicians.

In 2004, he agreed to produce and participate as a guitarist/bassist in Stauch's new band Savage Circus. He left Savage Circus in December 2011 to focus on Iron Savior exclusively again.

Discography

Iron Savior
 Iron Savior (1997)
 Coming Home (EP, 1998)
 Unification (1998)
 Interlude (EP, 1999)
 I've Been to Hell (Single, 2000)
 Dark Assault (2001)
 Condition Red (2002)
 Battering Ram (2004)
 Megatropolis (2007)
 The Landing (2011)
 Rise of the Hero (2014)
 Titancraft (2016)
 Reforged – Riding on Fire (2017)
 Kill or Get Killed (2019)

Savage Circus
 Dreamland Manor (2005)
 Of Doom and Death (2009)

Guest recording
 Gamma Ray: Sigh No More backing vocals (1991)
 Hansen – XXX : 30 Years of Metal (2016)

References

External links 
 Official Iron Savior homepage
 Official Savage Circus homepage

1964 births
Living people
German heavy metal guitarists
German male guitarists
German heavy metal singers
German male singers
Iron Savior members
Savage Circus members